Bawa may refer to:

People

Surname
 Avantika Bawa (born 1973), Indian-American artist, curator, and professor
 Gurmeet Bawa (born 1944), Indian Punjabi singer
 Hemi Bawa, Indian painter and sculptor
 Kamaljit S. Bawa (born 1939), Indian evolutionary ecologist, conservation biologist and professor
 Manjit Bawa (1941–2008), Indian painter
 Ranjit Bawa (born 1991), Panjabi Sikh singer
 Robin Bawa (born 1966), Canadian ice hockey player
 Samridh Bawa (born 1990), Indian model, television actor and director
 Vikram Bawa (born 1970), Indian fashion, advertising and landscape photographer

Given name
 Bawa Balwant (1915–1972), Indian writer, poet and essayist
 Bawa Jain (born 1957), secretary-general for the World Council of Religious Leaders
 Bawa Muhaiyaddeen (died 1986), Sri Lankan Tamil-speaking teacher and Sufi mystic
 Bawa Andani Yakubu (1926–2002), police officer, politician and king

Other uses
 British Athletics Writers' Association
 Birds Australia Western Australia
 Bawa Falls, in South Africa
 Bawa, Iran, a village in Iran